Muncy may refer to:

People
 Baron Muncy (c.1300), English peerage title held by Walter de Muncy
 Becky Muncy, American educator in Indiana
 Jeff Muncy, American television producer and toy designer
 Matt Muncy (born 1983), American former professional football player
 Max Muncy (born 1990), American professional baseball player
 Max Muncy (baseball, born 2002), American baseball player

Places
In Pennsylvania
Muncy, Pennsylvania, a borough in Lycoming County
Muncy Creek Township, Lycoming County, Pennsylvania
Muncy Township, Lycoming County, Pennsylvania
Muncy Historic District, located in Muncy Township
Muncy Junior-Senior High School, located in Muncy Township
Muncy School District, located in southern Lycoming County
Muncy Valley, Pennsylvania, an unincorporated community in Sullivan County

Elsewhere
Muncy, Oklahoma, an unincorporated community in Texas County, Oklahoma
Tylersville, Ohio, an unincorporated community previously known as Pug Muncy

Events
1938 Muncy Raft crash
Muncy Abolition riot of 1842

Other
Muncy (grape), another name for the Catawba grape
Muncy Creek, a tributary of the West Branch Susquehanna River
Little Muncy Creek, a tributary of Muncy Creek
State Correctional Institution – Muncy, a women's prison in Pennsylvania

See also
Muncey, surname
Muncie (disambiguation)
Munsee (disambiguation)
Munsey (disambiguation)
Mansi (disambiguation)
Minsi (disambiguation)